Mixed Blood is a remix/cover album of songs originally by Belgian-Australian singer-songwriter Gotye, released in July 2007. All the songs are from his album Like Drawing Blood, except for "The Only Thing I Know" and "Out of My Mind", which come from Gotye's debut album Boardface (although a version of "The Only Thing I Know" was later included in the international release of Like Drawing Blood in 2008).

Karnivool's cover of "The Only Way" came 63rd in the Triple J Hottest 100, 2007.

Track listing
 "Hearts a Mess" (3am Mix) by Joe Hardy – 6:03
 "The Only Way" by Karnivool – 4:54
 "Puzzle with a Piece Missing" (Remix) by ENS – 4:18
 "Heart's a Mess" (Electro-Baltimore Club Mix) by DLake – 5:23
 "Get Acquainted" by Faux Pas (a remix of the track "A Distinctive Sound") – 3:51
 "Learnalilgivinanlovin" (That'll Learn 'Em Remix) by Bass Kleph – 4:17
 "Thanks for Your Time" (Remix) by Bitrok – 4:12
 "The Only Thing I Know" (Remix) by Infusion – 4:56
 "Hearts a Mess" (Remix) by Duosseudo – 5:21
 "Seven Hours with a Backseat Driver" (Way Back When Mix) by Rocky Lolo – 4:44
 "Out of My Mind" (Oceans of Dubs) by King Charlie – 4:42
 "Puzzle with a Piece Missing" by Velure – 4:05
 "Coming Back" by Inga Liljeström and Michael Lira – 3:20
 "Worn Out" by Fourth Floor Collapse – 3:06

Charts

References

2007 albums
ARIA Award-winning albums
Gotye albums